The 2007–08 Toronto Maple Leafs season began October 4, 2007. It is the 91st season of the franchise, 81st season as the Maple Leafs.

In an effort to return to the playoffs in 2007–08, the Leafs made two significant moves during the off-season.  The first was to acquire goaltender Vesa Toskala (along with Mark Bell) from the San Jose Sharks in exchange for three draft picks. Toronto also signed free agent Jason Blake to a five-year, $20 million contract. Blake reached the 40-goal mark for the first time in 2006–07.

With the Leafs struggling in the Northeast Division, the future of John Ferguson Jr.'s tenure as general manager has been widely debated after club president Richard Peddie admitted that hiring Ferguson was "a mistake".  According to TSN, the Leafs asked former Toronto general manager Cliff Fletcher to serve as interim general manager early in January. On January 22, it was announced that Ferguson's time with the club had ended, as the board of directors at Maple Leaf Sports & Entertainment voted to make a change. Fletcher was named interim general manager of the team.

Defenceman Tomas Kaberle was selected to represent the Maple Leafs and the Eastern Conference at the 2008 All-Star Game in Atlanta, Georgia. He hit all four targets in four shots to become the winner of the accuracy competition.

Regular season
On October 8, 2007, newly acquired winger Jason Blake announced that he had chronic myelogenous leukemia, a treatable form of cancer. He continued playing during treatment.

In mid-November 2007, Jiri Tlusty was caught in a scandal when nude photos of him appeared on the Internet. Tlusty apologized for this incident and admitted that he made a mistake.

The Maple Leafs struggled on the penalty kill during the regular season, allowing an NHL-high 77 power-play goals.

Divisional standings

Conference standings

Playoffs
For the third straight year, the Leafs did not qualify for the playoffs.

Schedule and results

October

Record: 5–5–3; Home: 3–4–2; Road: 2–1–1

November

Record: 4–6–3; Home: 1–1–3; Road: 3–5–0

December

Record: 6–5–2; Home: 3–2–0; Road: 3–3–2

January

Record:5–8–1 ; Home: 4–2–0; Road: 1–6–1

February

Record: 8–4–1 ; Home: 5–3–0 ; Road: 3–1–1

March

Record: 8–5–0; Home: 2–4–0; Road: 6–1–0

April

Record: 0–2–1; Home: 0–1–1; Road: 0–1–0

 † Hockey Hall of Fame Game

Playoffs
On March 27, 2008, the Toronto Maple Leafs were eliminated from postseason contention for the third straight season following a 4–2 loss to the Boston Bruins.

Player statistics
Final stats

Skaters

Goaltenders

†Denotes player spent time with another team before joining Maple Leafs. Stats reflect time with Maple Leafs only.
‡Traded mid-season.
Bold/italics denotes franchise record.

Awards and records

Records
 On October 11, 2007, in an 8–1 victory over the New York Islanders, Mats Sundin scored his 390th goal as a Leaf, and earned his 917th point in a Leaf uniform breaking Darryl Sittler's team record as the all-time points and goals leader.

Milestones

Transactions
The Maple Leafs have been involved in the following transactions during the 2007–08 season.

Trades

Free agents

Claimed from waivers

Draft picks
Toronto's picks at the 2007 NHL Entry Draft in Columbus, Ohio.

See also
 2007–08 NHL season

References

Toronto Maple Leafs seasons
Toronto Maple Leafs season, 2007-08
Tor